The Archambault Bagheera is a French trailerable sailboat that was first built in 1968.

Production
The design was built by Archambault Boats of Dangé-Saint-Romain, France, starting in 1968, but it is now out of production. Archambault, which had been founded in 1967, went out of business in 2015.

Design
The Bagheera is a recreational keelboat, built predominantly of fibreglass, with wood trim. It has a fractional sloop rig with aluminum spars, a deck-stepped mast with wire standing rigging. The hull has a raked stem, a reverse transom, a lazarette, a skeg-mounted rudder controlled by a tiller and a fixed fin keel. It displaces  and carries  of ballast.

See also
List of sailing boat types

References

External links
Photo of a Bagheera
Photo of a Bagheera

Keelboats
1960s sailboat type designs
Sailing yachts
Trailer sailers
Sailboat type designs by French designers
Sailboat types built by Archambault Boats